Iron Doors is a 2010 German 3D thriller film directed by Stephen Manuel.

Plot
A man (Axel Wedekind) wakes up in a strange concrete vault after a night of drinking and realizes he is trapped. With the help of an unlikely companion (Rungano Nyoni) who is also trapped, they must find a way out before they starve to death.

Cast
 Axel Wedekind
 Rungano Nyoni

References

External links
 

2010 films
2010 3D films
2010 thriller films
German 3D films
English-language German films
Films shot in Cologne
2010s English-language films
2010s German films